Brigadier-General Alfred James Whitacre Allen  (7 November 1857 – 1939) was a British Army officer.

Military career 
Born to Major John Whitacre Allen and Eliza Whiteside, he was educated at Winchester College. He was commissioned into the 3rd Regiment of Foot on 12 February 1876. He served in the Anglo-Zulu War in 1879. Promoted to captain in 1885, he served as Staff Captain in the Nile Expedition (1884-1885), passed staff college in 1886 and served as Aide-de-camp to Major-General, Bengal, 1888-1890; Station Staff Officer, 1st Class, 1890-1892; Deputy Assistant Quarter Master General - Intelligence, Army Headquarters, India, 1892-1895. Promoted to major in 1895, he served in the Mohmand campaign of 1897–1898, where he was Deputy Assistant Adjutant and Quarter Master General on the Tirah campaign and thereafter was the Station Staff Officer, 1st Class, Punjab, 1898-1899; Deputy Assistant-Adjutant-General Punjab, 1899-1900. Promoted to Lieutenant-Colonel in 1901, he was breveted Colonel in 1904 and promoted to the substantive rank of Colonel in 1908; having served as Assistant-Adjutant-General, 1900-1903; Commandant Deolali Depot, 1903-1905; officiating Assistant-Quartermaster-General Western Command, Poona, 1905-1906. From 1909 to 1913, he served Officer Commanding the British Troops in Ceylon with the rank of Brigadier-General and retired on 21 June 1913 in the honorary rank of Brigadier-General. He was recalled in  September 1914 as Brigade Commander, 74th Brigade, 25th Division as part of the new army and served till February 1916 when he was relieved before seeing action. For his services he was appointed a Companion of the Order of the Bath in the 1908 Birthday Honours, and awarded the Zulu War Medal with clasp, Egypt Medal with clasp, Khedive's Star, India Medal with two clasps and mentioned in dispatches.

In 1889 he married Mary Emily, daughter of Lieutenant-General Sir John Hudson.

References

1857 births
1939 deaths
Companions of the Order of the Bath
Buffs (Royal East Kent Regiment) officers
British Army personnel of the Anglo-Zulu War
British Army personnel of the Anglo-Egyptian War
British Army generals of World War I
Graduates of the Staff College, Camberley
General Officers Commanding, Ceylon
Official members of the Legislative Council of Ceylon
People educated at Winchester College
British people in colonial India